Epanycles is a monotypic moth genus in the subfamily Arctiinae. Its single species, Epanycles imperialis, is found in Costa Rica, Guatemala and the Amazon region. Both the genus and species were first described by Arthur Gardiner Butler in 1876.

References

Arctiinae